Grace Evelyn Potter (born June 20, 1983) is an American singer-songwriter and musician who formed Grace Potter and the Nocturnals in 2002.  Potter released her debut solo record Original Soul on 2004 via Grace Potter Music.  Potter and her band parted ways in 2015, just before the release of her solo album, Midnight. Her latest album, Daylight, was released in 2019. In 2011, Potter and Higher Ground founded Grand Point North music festival in Burlington, Vermont. The music festival celebrates local acts, promotes area businesses and has attracted national performing artists, including Kenny Chesney, Jackson Browne, The Avett Brothers, Trey Anastasio, Nathaniel Rateliff, The Flaming Lips, Trampled By Turtles, Gov't Mule, and more.

Solo career
Since the formation of Grace Potter and the Nocturnals, Potter has gained notability as a singer-songwriter, multi-instrumentalist, and actress.

Film and television
As an actress, Potter appeared in an episode of One Tree Hill, performing her original song "Apologies." In 2010, Potter re-recorded "Something That I Want" with altered lyrics for the end credits to Disney's animated feature Tangled. The following year, Potter was the voice of Carol in Disney's Prep & Landing: Naughty vs. Nice, for which she also wrote and recorded "Naughty, Naughty Children (Better Start Actin' Nice)." Potter made guest appearances on ABC's The Chew in 2012 and 2015. In 2015, Potter performed The Star-Spangled Banner during Super Bowl Champion New England Patriots' season opener. On January 25, 2016, Conan O'Brien aired an hour-long special episode of Conan (talk show) on TBS that chronicled a trip the comedian made to Al Udeid Air Base in Qatar; he was joined by First Lady Michelle Obama with Potter as his musical guest.

Collaborations

Potter has developed a successful working relationship with country music star Kenny Chesney; their duets have climbed the country music charts and received critical acclaim. Potter earned her first Grammy nomination for Best Country Duo/Group Performance for "You And Tequila" with Chesney. The pair has performed together live numerous times, and their collaboration on the song "Wild Child" off of Chesney's album The Big Revival  garnered award nominations from the Academy of Country Music, CMT Music and the Country Music Association. Chesney appeared at Potter's Grand Point North music festival in 2011, 2013, 2015, and 2018.

Potter has also enjoyed a fruitful relationship with The Flaming Lips. In 2012, she joined the band during their show at The Lyric in Oxford, Mississippi, which was part of their attempt to break the Guinness World Record for Most Concerts Played in different cities in a 24-hour period. That same year, Potter and The Flaming Lips collaborated on a recording of "My Mechanical Friend" (which she also wrote) for the companion soundtrack to Disney and Tim Burton's film Frankenweenie. In 2014, she contributed to their cover of The Beatles' "Good Morning Good Morning" for their With a Little Help from My Fwends album. The Flaming Lips performed during Potter's Grand Point North music festival in 2015.

Midnight

Potter's second solo album, Midnight, was released on August 14, 2015, on Hollywood Records. Midnight was recorded and mixed at Barefoot Studios in Hollywood with producer Eric Valentine, who has worked with artists ranging from Queens of the Stone Age to Nickel Creek. The core studio band consisted of Potter and Valentine along with Matt Burr on drums and percussion. Members of Potter's band The Nocturnals – Scott Tournet, Benny Yurco and bassist Michael Libramento – played guitar, while friends such as Rayland Baxter, Audra Mae, Noelle Scaggs of Fitz and the Tantrums, Wayne Coyne of The Flaming Lips, and Nick Oliveri of Queens of the Stone Age played various instruments. Potter cites an eclectic array of musical influences for Midnights unique sound, including Miles Davis, Bob Dylan, The Beatles, David Bowie, Blondie and Beck.

The seeds for Midnight were planted in Vermont during the fall of 2013. Potter explains the evolution of the record: I had been messing around for a few weeks with making really wacked-out home demos – lots of sounds, beats and melodies that I had never tried before. It was a dark, stormy, moody day and I could hear the thunder in the distance – these big ominous clouds were rolling in fast. There was something about that threat of inclement weather beyond my control that just made me vibrate with anticipation and adrenaline, so I channeled it into this heavy boogie song—it goes right for the throat and says 'Own your existence on earth, because who knows what's gonna happen next.' That solitary moment guided everything that followed.

Daylight
Potter's third solo album, Daylight, was released on October 25, 2019, on Fantasy Records. Eric Valentine produced Daylight, and added guest musicians Jess Wolfe and Holly Laessig of Lucius, and Benmont Tench. The Daylight Tour began on January 8, 2020. During the global pandemic caused by COVID-19. Potter launched the weekly Twilight streaming series, taping a special episode on the set of the original Star Trek.

In popular culture

Potter's version of the Stealer's Wheel song "Stuck in the Middle with You" was used as the theme song for the Netflix series Grace and Frankie (2015–2020).

"Something That I Want" appeared in the closing credit of the animated film Tangled (2010).

In 2017, her song "Instigators" was featured in the video game Dirt 4.

Personal life
Potter and her husband, record producer Eric Valentine, had a baby boy, Sagan Potter Valentine on January 12, 2018. Potter had previously been married to Nocturnals bandmate Matt Burr, on May 11, 2013. Upon their divorce, Burr departed from the Nocturnals.

In a 2011 interview with Out Front, Potter identified as bisexual and claimed to have a sexual relationship with then-Nocturnals bassist Catherine Popper.

Throughout her career, Potter has championed the Alzheimer's Association in honor of her paternal grandfather's battle with Alzheimer's disease. She frequently participates in the "Night At Sardi's" annual fundraiser in Los Angeles.

Discography

Albums

Singles

As lead artist

As featured artist

Other appearances

References

External links

Living people
American women singer-songwriters
Songwriters from Vermont
American rock guitarists
1983 births
American rock pianists
American women pianists
American organists
Women organists
American rock keyboardists
American multi-instrumentalists
Music festival founders
American women rock singers
Grace Potter and the Nocturnals members
Guitarists from Vermont
21st-century American keyboardists
21st-century American women singers
21st-century American pianists
21st-century American women guitarists
21st-century American guitarists
21st-century organists
21st-century American singers
Bisexual musicians
Bisexual women